Kirtland Central High School (KCHS) is located in the town of Kirtland, New Mexico, United States. Its colors are Purple & Gold and their mascot is the Bronco.  KCHS is a part of the Central Consolidated School District along with Newcomb High School and Shiprock High School.

Athletics

Kirtland Central is a New Mexico Activities Association (NMAA) AAAA school in District 1-4A. KCHS competes in 15 NMAA sport and Activity Events. KCHS has taken a total of 32 State Championships in 3A & 4A.

Girls' Basketball
The Kirtland Central girls basketball program has put together one of the most astonishing dynasties in New Mexico high school sports. Since 1979, the Lady Broncos have appeared in 31 State Championship games and has a total of 19 state titles and 12 runners-up. Kirtland Central is also nationally ranked in girls basketball for having numerous state titles among with other programs in the USA by the National Federation of State High School Associations. The girls program has produced many All-Americans, such as; Colette Hatch (New Mexico State), Cara Priddy (University of Texas), Karina Zapata (Brigham Young) and Karyn Karlin (University of Arkansas). Kirtland Central also had numerous great outstanding standouts such as Nadia Begay (Boise State), Jaimey Tanner (Montana State), Sharon Max (Eastern New Mexico) and many others.

The girls' program began with making it to the state championship game in 1979 before falling to St. Pius X High School. They then won eight consecutive state titles (1980-1987). Kirtland Central then became major rivals with Shiprock High School. Together, they have met for state championship a total of nine times, with Kirtland winning five: (1987, 1993, 1994, 1995, 2010) and Shiprock winning four: (1988, 1989, 1990, 1992). Kirtland Central also won four state titles in 1993, 1994, 1995, and 1996, and made a 3-peat from 2003 to 2005. The Lady Broncos had undefeated seasons in 1981 (27-0), 1984 (26-0), 1986 (27-0), and 1996 (27-0). In addition, the Lady Broncos were runners-up in 1979, 1988, 1989, 1990, 1992, 1998, 2000, 2002, 2007, 2008, 2011, 2019, and 2020. 

The most recent state title occurred in 2022 as the Broncos defeated Bernalillo High School.

Championship Games
1979…St. Pius X 51 Kirtland Central 44     (3A State Championship) 
1980…Kirtland Central 52 Los Lunas 46      (3A State Championship) 
1981…Kirtland Central 50 Portales 36       (3A State Championship) 
1982…Kirtland Central 66 Tohatchi 35       (3A State Championship) 
1983…Kirtland Central 56 Bernalillo 54     (3A State Championship) 
1984…Kirtland Central 65 Bloomfield 28     (3A State Championship) 
1985…Kirtland Central 44 St. Pius X 30     (3A State Championship) 
1986…Kirtland Central 52 St. Pius X 43     (3A State Championship) 
1987…Kirtland Central 62 Shiprock 61       (3A State Championship) 
1988…Shiprock 60 Kirtland Central 58       (3A State Championship) 
1989…Shiprock 83 Kirtland Central 55       (3A State Championship) 
1990…Shiprock 57 Kirtland Central 36       (3A State Championship) 
1992…Shiprock 58 Kirtland Central 54       (3A State Championship) 
1993…Kirtland Central 47 Shiprock 46       (3A State Championship) 
1994…Kirtland Central 57 Shiprock 54       (3A State Championship) 
1995…Kirtland Central 68 Shiprock 49       (3A State Championship)
1996…Kirtland Central 61 Pojoaque 55       (3A State Championship)
1998…Pojoaque 67 Kirtland Central 65       (3A State Championship)
1999…Kirtland Central 46 Artesia 33        (3A State Championship)
2000…Silver 60 Kirtland Central 57         (3A State Championship)
2001…Kirtland Central 66 Farmington 55     (4A State Championship)
2002…Farmington 71 Kirtland Central 63     (4A State Championship)
2003…Kirtland Central 89 Moriarty 59       (4A State Championship)
2004…Kirtland Central 42 Farmington 35     (4A State Championship)
2005…Kirtland Central 65 Deming 50         (4A State Championship)
2007…Aztec 52 Kirtland Central 46          (4A State Championship)
2008…St. Pius X 57 Kirtland Central 48     (4A State Championship)
2010…Kirtland Central 71 Shiprock 52       (4A State Championship)
2011…Gallup 60 Kirtland Central 46         (4A State Championship)
2012…Kirtland Central 42 Roswell 41        (4A State Championship)
2019…Los Lunas 49 Kirtland Central 43      (4A State Championship)
2020…Los Lunas 47 Kirtland Central 33      (4A State Championship)
2022…Kirtland Central 55 Bernalillo 32     (4A State Championship)

References 

 http://kchs.centralschools.org/
 http://www.nmact.org/
 http://www.nmact.org/file/Girls_Basketball_Records.pdf
 http://www.nmact.org/file/Basketball%20Girls%20Coaches%20Champions.pdf
 http://www.nfhs.org/

Public high schools in New Mexico
Schools in San Juan County, New Mexico